USS O-14 (SS-75) was one of 16 O-class submarines built for the United States Navy during World War I.

Description
The later O-boats (O-11 through O-16) were designed by Lake Torpedo Boat Company to different specifications from the earlier ones designed by Electric Boat. They did not perform as well, and are sometimes considered a separate class. They displaced  on the surface and  submerged. The O-class submarines had a crew of 29 officers and enlisted men.

For surface running, the boats were powered by two  diesel engines, each driving one propeller shaft. When submerged each propeller was driven by a  electric motor. They could reach  on the surface and  underwater.

The boats were armed with four 18-inch (450 mm)  torpedo tubes in the bow. They carried four reloads, for a total of eight torpedoes. The O-class submarines were also armed with a single 3"/50 caliber deck gun.

Construction and career
O-14 was laid down on 6 July 1916 at California Shipbuilding Company in Long Beach, California. The boat was launched on 6 May 1918 sponsored by Miss Eleanor N. Hatch, and commissioned on 1 October 1918. One of many N and O-class submarines building just prior to the U.S. entry into World War I, O-14 commissioned too late for World War I combat service, but reported to Cape May, New Jersey, in 1919. In September, she was placed in commission, in reserve, at Cape May. In October she proceeded to Philadelphia, Pennsylvania, for fitting out.

In 1922, O-14 was based at Coco Solo, Panama Canal Zone; on 26 January, she sailed to Guantanamo Bay, Cuba on a trial run.  At Guantanamo Bay in February, she operated in formation in and around the Virgin Islands in March, before returning to Coco Solo. In May, O-14, with O-15 and O-16, resumed diving operations, which continued into 1923 as SubDiv 10 conducted diving tactical operations. In November, O-14 proceeded to Philadelphia.

Decommissioning on 17 June 1924 after just five and a half years of service, O-14 was turned over to the Commandant, Navy Yard, Philadelphia. Struck from the Naval Vessel Register on 9 May 1930, the boat was scrapped in accordance with the London Naval Treaty on 30 July 1930.

Notes

References

External links
 

United States O-class submarines
World War I submarines of the United States
Ships built in Los Angeles
1918 ships